Beijing Shuren-Ribet Private School (SRPS) is a K-12 private school in Songzhuang, Tongzhou District, Beijing. It has both day and boarding programs.

Wang Jianchao, a former university professor, founded Beijing Shuren Private School in 1993. Honors Diploma, Advanced Diploma, and Standard Diploma are all available at the school.

Notable alumni
Jiang Yiyi

References

External links
 Beijing Shuren-Ribet Private School

International schools in Beijing
Buildings and structures in Tongzhou District, Beijing